Boca Raton Fire Engine No. 1 is a historic fire engine in Boca Raton, Florida, United States. It is located at 100 South Ocean Boulevard. An American LaFrance built in 1925 and still used for parades and fire safety education, it was added to the US National Register of Historic Places on November 1, 2001. It was later moved from its Ocean Boulevard location to the old Fire Station #2 at 1 Southwest Twelfth Avenue.

References

External links
 Palm Beach County listings at National Register of Historic Places
 Boca Raton Fire Engine No. 1 at Florida's Office of Cultural and Historical Programs

National Register of Historic Places in Palm Beach County, Florida
Boca Raton, Florida
Firefighting in Florida
1925 establishments in Florida
Fire service vehicles
Freightliner Trucks vehicles
Individual vehicles
Vehicles introduced in 1925